Ty Gwyn (Welsh for "White" or "Blessed House") may refer to:

 Ty Gwyn on the Taf (Ty Gwyn ar Daf), the supposed site of the legendary Welsh parliament that produced the [aws of Hywel Dda
 Whitland (Hendy-gwyn, "Old White House") in Carmarthenshire, the present settlement there
 Ty Gwyn, a former monastic community near Whitesands Bay in Pembrokeshire with ties to SS. Patrick and David
 Ty Gwyn Tower at Barmouth in Gwynedd
 Ty Gwyn at Crossways in Monmouthshire, a producer of cider
 Tygwyn railway station at Glan-y-wern in Gwynedd on the Cambrian Line
 Ty Gwyn, the former name for Clydach in Swansea
 Ty Gwyn, an estate in Penylan, Cardiff

Welsh language